Carpo may refer to:     
 In Greek mythology, one of the Horae
 In astronomy, Carpo (moon), an irregular satellite of Jupiter